Route 249 is a two-lane north/south highway on the south shore of the Saint Lawrence River in Quebec, Canada. Its northern terminus is in Val-des-Sources at the junction of Route 255, and the southern terminus is at the junction of Route 112 close to Magog.

Municipalities along Route 249
 Magog
 Sherbrooke
 Saint-Denis-de-Brompton
 Saint-François-Xavier-de-Brompton, Quebec
 Windsor
 Val-Joli
 Saint-Claude
 Saint-Georges-de-Windsor
 Val-des-Sources

See also
 List of Quebec provincial highways

References

External links 
 Route 249 on Google Maps
 Provincial Route Map (Courtesy of the Quebec Ministry of Transportation) 

249
Transport in Magog, Quebec
Transport in Sherbrooke